Norm Dickson (8 October 1915 – 25 July 2004) was  a former Australian rules footballer who played with Richmond in the Victorian Football League (VFL).

Notes

External links 
		

1915 births
2004 deaths
Australian rules footballers from Victoria (Australia)
Richmond Football Club players